The Surrey and Sussex Junction Railway was an abortive railway scheme which obtained powers in July 1865 to build a line from Croydon to Tunbridge Wells, via Oxted with the intention that it should be worked by the London Brighton and South Coast Railway (LB&SCR). The project was abandoned in 1867, before completion, following withdrawal of support by the LB&SCR, but part of the trackbed was later used in the construction of the Oxted Line.

History
The railway originated as an independent scheme drawn up by several former officers and directors of the LB&SCR in 1864 for a line from Croydon to Tunbridge Wells, via Oxted. The intention was that the line, once built, would be worked by, or else leased to, the LB&SCR.

The scheme, and particularly the involvement of the then LB&SCR chairman Leo Schuster, attracted opposition from the South Eastern Railway (SER) who saw it as a significant incursion into their territory, creating a new direct line from London to Tunbridge Wells in opposition to their own existing one, and thereby contravening an 1849 agreement between the two companies. In retaliation, the SER put forward proposals for a new 'London, Lewes and Brighton' railway, together with the London Chatham and Dover Railway. There were also irregularities in the purchase of land, and criticisms of the use of foreign labour by the contractors.

As a result of these difficulties and the financial crisis of 1866-7, the LB&SCR signed a new agreement with the SER in which they withdrew support for the scheme and the SER abandoned their own scheme. Work on the new line ceased, but the Surrey and Sussex company remained in existence until 1869 when it was merged with the LB&SCR and then closed.

Much of the trackbed for this railway was later used in a joint scheme by the LB&SCR and SER to create a joint line from Croydon to Oxted.

References

Railway companies established in 1864
Pre-grouping British railway companies
Rail transport in East Sussex
Rail transport in Surrey
History of East Sussex
History of Surrey
1864 establishments in England